Kenechi Nduka Udeze (born March 5, 1983) is an American football coach and former player who is the assistant defensive line coach for the Tennessee Titans of the National Football League (NFL). He previously served as the linebackers coach at the Vanderbilt University in 2020.

Udeze played  as a defensive end in the NFL for four seasons during the early 2000s. He played college football for the University of Southern California (USC), and earned consensus All-American honors. The Minnesota Vikings picked Udeze in the first round of the 2004 NFL Draft. He was forced to retire in 2008 after he was diagnosed with acute lymphoblastic leukemia.

Early years
Udeze was born in Los Angeles. He attended Verbum Dei High School, a Jesuit-affiliated Roman Catholic school in Los Angeles, where he played high school football for the Verbum Dei Eagles and competed in track as a shot putter (top-throw of 56-7 or 17.34m).

Playing career

College
While attending the University of Southern California, Udeze played for coach Pete Carroll's USC Trojans football team from 2001 to 2003.  He was a three-year starter and helped his team to a 2004 Rose Bowl victory and AP national title as a junior.  He finished his college career with 135 tackles (51 of them for a loss), 28 sacks (a school record), 14 forced fumbles, three fumble recoveries, one interception, five pass deflections, and two blocked kicks.  As a junior in 2003, he was a first-team All-Pac-10 selection, and was recognized as a consensus first-team All-American.

National Football League

Minnesota Vikings
Udeze was drafted by the Minnesota Vikings in the first round (twentieth overall pick) of the 2004 NFL Draft.  During his rookie season with the Vikings, he started 15 games and recorded 36 tackles, five sacks, one forced fumble, and one pass deflected.  As a second year pro, Udeze was injured in the Vikings third game of the season with cartilage damage in his left knee, which kept him out the rest of the year.  Udeze finished the season with three games started, five tackles, and one quarterback sack. In 2006, he was once again the starter at left defensive end, playing 16 games, starting 15 and recorded 29 tackles and no sacks. The following year, he again playing in all 16 games, with 15 starts, and had 47 tackles and five sacks.

Illness and retirement
On February 11, 2008, it was announced that Udeze was diagnosed by doctors with a form of leukemia: acute lymphoblastic leukemia. KMSP-TV (Ch. 9) also reported that Udeze was at Fairview Southdale Hospital undergoing tests and that he was at the Mayo Clinic in Rochester the week before. Udeze revealed that his acute leukemia is in a state of remission. Udeze received a bone marrow transplant from his brother.

The Vikings placed Udeze on the non-football injury list and eventually injured reserve in July 2008, ending his season. Udeze returned to the Metrodome as an honorary captain for a game against the Green Bay Packers on November 9, 2008, where he said he would return to playing football. "You know what? I'll be back next year," Udeze told the St. Paul Pioneer Press.

Udeze was able to get back into good enough condition to return to the Vikings for 2009 pre-season training, reaching the physical form he was in before his illness.  He took 26 snaps during a Vikings mini-camp, but struggled with peripheral neuropathy in his feet, a result of his chemotherapy. The chemotherapy-induced neuropathy caused numbness that kept him from being able to plant firmly and create a burst up the field after the snap.  Finding himself unable to move at the level he was accustomed to, Udeze decided to retire, which he announced on July 29, 2009.

Coaching career

Washington
In 2009, Udeze joined University of Washington as their assistant strength and conditioning coach. Udeze was hired by the former USC assistant coach Steve Sarkisian, who had become head coach at Washington. He also worked with the defensive line. He also works heavily with charities that help raise money for cancer research.

Seattle Seahawks
In 2012, Udeze was hired as an assistant defensive line coach for the Seattle Seahawks.

Minnesota Vikings
In 2013, Udeze completed the Bill Walsh NFL Minority Coaching Fellowship program with the Minnesota Vikings.

Pittsburgh
In 2014, Udeze was hired as an assistant strength and conditioning coach at the University of Pittsburgh.

USC
In 2015, Udeze returned to his alma mater, University of Southern California, to work as an assistant strength and conditioning coach, where he rejoined former Washington coaches Steve Sarkisian and Ivan Lewis. In 2016, he was made defensive line coach.

LSU
In 2019, Udeze was hired as a Defensive Analyst at Louisiana State University, reuniting with his former defensive line coach at USC Ed Orgeron, who is now the head coach at LSU.

Vanderbilt
On January 21, 2020, Udeze joined Vanderbilt University as their linebackers coach.

Tennessee Titans
On January 29, 2021, Udeze was hired by the Tennessee Titans as their assistant defensive line coach under head coach Mike Vrabel.

Personal life
During his illness, Udeze decided to return to USC, where he resumed taking classes.  In May 2010, Udeze graduated with a degree in sociology.

References

External links
 Tennessee Titans profile 
Minnesota Vikings profile
USC Trojans profile 

1983 births
Living people
All-American college football players
American football defensive ends
Minnesota Vikings players
Coaches of American football from California
American sportspeople of Nigerian descent
USC Trojans football players
Washington Huskies football coaches
Players of American football from Los Angeles
Verbum Dei High School alumni
Sports coaches from Los Angeles
Ed Block Courage Award recipients